Royal Air Force Station Nicosia or RAF Nicosia was a Royal Air Force (RAF) station on the island of Cyprus, built in the 1930s. The station served as Headquarters Royal Air Force Cyprus from 8 June to 29 July 1941.

The original principal airport for Cyprus, Nicosia International Airport, was built within the site of the RAF station. Both civil and military aviation on the island operated from the site, although the RAF disestablished the station in 1966.

The 1974 Turkish invasion of Cyprus led to the cessation of commercial operations from the airport, although the site is still owned by the British Ministry of Defence, but is controlled by the United Nations Peacekeeping Force in Cyprus and used as a base by United Nations peace-keeping patrol helicopters.

Station history

Source: Britain's Small Wars

No. 6 Squadron RAF first used the airfield on 3 October 1946 with the Supermarine Spitfire LF.9 before re-equipping with the Hawker Tempest F.6 in December of that year and moving to RAF Shallufa on 5 September 1947. The squadron returned on 5 April 1951 with the de Havilland Vampire FB 5 before leaving to RAF Deversoir on 22 May 1951 however the unit soon returned on 31 May 1952 with the Vampire FB 9 before leaving on 11 July 1952 moving to RAF Habbaniya. The unit returned on 28 August 1954 with the de Havilland Venom FB 1 before moving again to Habbaniya on 5 October 1954, on 7 November 1955 the unit returned for the final time with the Venom FB 4. The squadron moved to Habbaniya on 12 December 1955.
No. 8 Squadron RAF – operating Auster AOP.6 (from Jul. 1950); de Havilland Vampire (from Jul. 1953)
No. 29 Squadron RAF – operating Gloster Javelin (from Mar. 1963)
No. 32 Squadron RAF – operating English Electric Canberra B2
No. 33 Squadron RAF – operating Gloster Javelin FAW7
No. 39 Squadron RAF – operating Gloster Meteor NF13
No. 43 Squadron RAF – operating Hawker Hunter FGA 9 (from Jun. 1961)
No. 46 Squadron RAF – operating unknown aircraft.
No. 70 Squadron RAF – operating Vickers Valetta C1, Handley Page Hastings
No. 73 Squadron RAF – operating de Havilland Venom FB4
No. 74 Squadron RAF – operating Spitfire V, later Mk IX (from Sep. 1943)
No. 80 Squadron RAF – operating Hawker Hurricane MkI (from Jun. 1941)
No. 84 Squadron RAF – operating Vickers Valetta C1
No. 103 Squadron RAF – operating Bristol Sycamore HC1
No. 114 Squadron RAF – operating Vickers Valetta C1, de Havilland Chipmunk T10
No. 127 Squadron RAF – operating unknown aircraft.
No. 162 Squadron RAF – operating unknown aircraft.
No. 185 Squadron RAF – operating ???
No. 202 Squadron RAF – operating Hawker Hunter F6
No. 203 Squadron RAF – operating unknown aircraft.
No. 208 Squadron RAF – operating Spitfire FR XVIII
No. 213 Squadron RAF – operating Tempest VI
No. 230 Squadron RAF – operating Scottish Aviation Pioneer CC1
No. 234 Squadron RAF – operating ???
No. 243 Squadron RAF – operating unknown aircraft.
No. 249 Squadron RAF – operating de Havilland Venom FB1
No. 250 Squadron RAF – operating unknown aircraft.
No. 256 Squadron RAF – operating ???
No. 261 Squadron RAF – operating unknown aircraft.
No. 272 Squadron RAF – operating unknown aircraft.
No. 284 Squadron RAF – operating Bristol Sycamore HR14
No. 294 Squadron RAF – operating unknown aircraft.
No. 451 Squadron RAAF – operating unknown aircraft.
No. 459 Squadron RAAF – operating unknown aircraft.
No. 603 Squadron RAF – operating ???
No. 680 Squadron RAF – operating unknown aircraft.
No. 14 Squadron RNZAF – operating de Havilland Vampire (1952–55)

RAF Regiments

No. 2 Squadron RAF Regiment
No. 21 Squadron RAF Regiment
No. 26 Squadron RAF Regiment
No. 27 Squadron RAF Regiment
No. 29 Squadron RAF Regiment
No. 34 Squadron RAF Regiment
No. 37 Squadron RAF Regiment

Current use

The site is now the currently largely disused Nicosia International Airport.

See also
 List of aircraft of the Royal Air Force
 List of former Royal Air Force stations
 List of Royal Air Force aircraft squadrons
 Royal Air Force station

References

Citations

Bibliography

External links

 The murder of Corporal Patrick J. Hale at RAF Nicosia
 RAF Nicosia

Royal Air Force stations in Cyprus
Royal Air Force stations of World War II in Europe
Royal Air Force stations of World War II in the Middle East
World War II airfields in Cyprus